Sweet Inspiration is the title of a Dan Penn/ Spooner Oldham composition written for and first recorded in 1967 by the Sweet Inspirations for whom it had afforded a Top 20 hit reaching #18 on the Billboard Hot 100 in the spring of 1968: a live version by Barbra Streisand - in medley with "Where You Lead" - would also become a Top 40 hit.

Background
The song was recorded in April 1967 at American Sound Studio in Memphis in the sessions for the Sweet Inspiration's self-titled debut album produced by Tommy Cogbill and Tom Dowd. Spooner Oldham and Dan Penn had observed the recording session for two tracks intended for The Sweet Inspirations album, which moved Oldham to suggest to Penn that they two could write a stronger song for the group - (Oldham quote:) "As we walked [from the studio] up the steps to [the company's] offices, Dan said: 'You got any ideas?' I said: 'What's wrong with 'Sweet Inspiration'?" Working with a single guitar Oldham and Penn wrote "Sweet Inspiration" in between an hour to ninety minutes upstairs, then returned to the studio and ran through the song for the Sweet Inspirations and the other session personnel, Penn singing the song to Oldham's guitar accompaniment. Although Tom Dowd called for a lunch break (Dan Penn quote:) "Spooner had [the opening rolling guitar] lick down so good the musicians wouldn't go eat...They knew by what was happening we could [immediately] cut [the track]" which was completed in a single take: Dowd and his coterie on returning to the studio from their lunch break were played the completed track of "Sweet Inspiration" - (Oldham quote:) "We basically gave 'em a gift. It was fun to see a creative idea come to fruition in about three hours time."

Issued as the fourth single from The Sweet Inspirations album, "Sweet Inspiration" reached a Billboard Hot 100 peak of #18 in the spring of 1968 also ranking as high as #5 on Billboard'''s R&B chart. The song also gave the group their first and only Grammy nomination for Best R&B Vocal Performance by a Duo or Group. At the 1969 ceremony, the group lost to The Temptations' "Cloud Nine".

Barbra Streisand versionMain article:Sweet Inspiration/ Where You Lead live medley 
Barbra Streisand would reach #37 on the Billboard Hot 100 with her 1972 single "Sweet Inspiration/ Where You Lead" a medley of "Sweet Inspiration" with "Where You Lead" which was the advance single from Streisand's live album Live Concert at the Forum.

Other versions
The first evident recorded "cover" of "Sweet Inspiration" was that by Diana Ross and The Supremes in collaboration with The Temptations on Diana Ross and The Supremes Join The Temptations a collaborative album by the two groups  released November 1968 for which "Sweet Inspiration" was recorded with Diana Ross and Eddie Kendricks as lead vocalists.

King Curtis recorded the song on his 1968 album Sweet Soul

Wilson Pickett recorded "Sweet Inspiration" for his March 1970 album release Right On, Picket having recorded "Sweet Inspiration" in a 29 August 1969 session at Criteria Studios (Miami) produced by Dave Crawford, which yielded five album tracks. 

In the autumn and winter of 1975-76 the Yandall Sisters would have a Top 40 hit in New Zealand with their remake of "Sweet Inspiration" which would peak at #8 on 31 October 1975.

Rita Coolidge recorded "Sweet Inspiration" for her May 1978 album release Love Me Again.

In 1989 Dutch female quartet Sisters would have reach #58 on the Nederlands Single Top 100 with their remake of "Sweet Inspiration" taken from the group's album Near Me.

Vonda Shepard recorded "Sweet Inspiration" for her 9 November 1999 album release Heart and Soul: New Songs from Ally McBeal.

Jackie DeShannon recorded "Sweet Inspiration" in a 2 December 1970 session at Capitol Recording Studio (Hollywood): the track was first issued as a bonus track on the 2006 CD release of DeShannon's 1971 album Songs''. 

The Derek Trucks Band on their 2009 release, Already Free, did a cover of Sweet Inspiration, creating a blues version of the song.

The song has been sampled by Ice Cube in his 1992 track "Check Yo Self" and by Salt-n-Pepa on 1993's "Shoop".

References

1967 songs
Songs written by Dan Penn
Songs written by Spooner Oldham
Sweet Inspirations songs